Mark Foster may refer to:

Mark Foster (swimmer) (born 1970), British swimmer
Mark Foster (soccer) (born 1973), retired American soccer player
Mark Foster (golfer) (born 1975), English golfer
Mark Foster (rugby union) (born 1983), English rugby union player
Mark Foster (musician), lead vocalist of Foster the People
MRK1 (Mark Foster), dubstep artist, formerly Mark One or Markone

See also
 Mark Forster (disambiguation)